Argyresthia is a genus of moths in the family Argyresthiidae, previously treated as subfamily Argyresthiinae in the family Yponomeutidae.

Species

Argyresthia abdominalis – Zeller, 1839 
Argyresthia abies – Freeman, 1972 
Argyresthia achillella – Costa, 1836 
Argyresthia aerariella – Stainton, 1871 
Argyresthia affinis – Braun, 1940 
Argyresthia albicomella – Moriuti, 1969 
Argyresthia albistria – Haworth, 1828 
Argyresthia alpha – Friese & Moriuti, 1968 
Argyresthia alternatella – Kearfott, 1908 
Argyresthia altissimella – Chambers, 1877 
Argyresthia amiantella – Zeller, 1847 
Argyresthia andereggiella – Duponchel, 1838 
Argyresthia andrianella Gibeaux, 1983
Argyresthia angusta – Moriuti, 1969 
Argyresthia annettella – Busck, 1907 
Argyresthia anthocephala – Meyrick, 1936 
Argyresthia aphoristis – Meyrick, 1938 
Argyresthia apicimaculella – Chambers, 1874 
Argyresthia arceuthina – Zeller, 1839 
Argyresthia arceuthobiella – Busck, 1917 
Argyresthia atlanticella – Rebel, 1940 
Argyresthia atmoriella – Bankes, 1896 
Argyresthia aureoargentella – Brower, 1953 
Argyresthia aurivittella – Wood, 1839 
Argyresthia aurulentella – Stainton, 1849 
Argyresthia austerella – Zeller, 1873 
Argyresthia belangerella – Chambers, 1875 
Argyresthia bergiella – Ratzeburg, 1840 
Argyresthia beta – Friese & Moriuti, 1968 
Argyresthia biruptella – Zeller, 1877 
Argyresthia bobyella 	Gibeaux, 1983
Argyresthia bolliella – Busck, 1907 
Argyresthia bonnetella
Argyresthia brockeella – Hübner, 1805 
Argyresthia buvati – Gibeaux, 1992 
Argyresthia caesiella – Treitschke, 1833 
Argyresthia calliphanes – Meyrick, 1913 
Argyresthia canadensis – Canadian arborvitae leafminer – Freeman, 1972 
Argyresthia carcinomatella – Zeller, 1877 
 † Argyresthia castaneella – chestnut ermine moth (extinct)
Argyresthia certella – Zeller, 1847 
Argyresthia chalcocausta – Meyrick, 1935 
Argyresthia chalcochrysa – Meyrick, 1918 
Argyresthia chamaecypariae – Moriuti, 1965 
Argyresthia chionochrysa – Meyrick, 1931 
Argyresthia chrysidella – Peyerimhoff, 1877 
Argyresthia columbia – Freeman, 1972 
Argyresthia communana – Moriuti, 1969 
Argyresthia conjugella – apple fruit moth – Zeller, 1839 
Argyresthia conspersa – Butler, 1883 
Argyresthia cupressella – Walsingham, 1890 
Argyresthia curvella – Linnaeus, 1761  (synonym: Argyresthia cornella)
Argyresthia cyaneimarmorella – Milliére, 1854 
Argyresthia decimella – Wocke, 1864 
Argyresthia deletella – Zeller, 1873 
Argyresthia denudatella – Zeller, 1847 
Argyresthia diffractella – Zeller, 1877 
Argyresthia dilectella – Zeller, 1874 
Argyresthia dislocata – Meyrick, 
Argyresthia divisella – Dufrane, 1960 
Argyresthia dulcamarella – Bruand, 1856 
Argyresthia dzieduszyckii – Nowicki, 1860 
Argyresthia ephippella – Fabricius, 1777 
Argyresthia eugeniella – guava moth – Busck, 1917 
Argyresthia fagetella – Zeller, 1847 
Argyresthia festiva – Moriuti, 1969 
Argyresthia flavicomans – Moriuti, 1969 
Argyresthia flavipes 	Gibeaux, 1983
Argyresthia flexilis – Freeman, 1961 
Argyresthia franciscella – Busck, 1915 
Argyresthia freyella – Walsingham, 1890 
Argyresthia fujiyamae – Moriuti, 1969 
Argyresthia fundella – Fischer von Röslerstamm, 1835 
Argyresthia furcatella – Busck, 1917 
Argyresthia fuscilineella – Bruand, 1850 
Argyresthia gephyritis – Meyrick, 1938 
Argyresthia glabratella – Zeller, 1847 
Argyresthia glaucinella – Zeller, 1839 
Argyresthia goedartella – Linnaeus, 1758
Argyresthia helvetica – Heinemann, 1877 
Argyresthia hilfiella – Rebel, 1910 
Argyresthia huguenini – Frey, 1882 
Argyresthia icterias – Meyrick, 1907 
Argyresthia idiograpta – Meyrick, 1935 
Argyresthia illuminatella – Zeller, 1839 
Argyresthia impura – Staudinger, 1880 
Argyresthia inauratella – Tengström, 1847 
Argyresthia inexpectella Gibeaux, 1983
Argyresthia inscriptella – Busck, 1907 
Argyresthia iopleura – Meyrick, 1918 
Argyresthia italaviana 	Gibeaux, 1983
Argyresthia ivella – Haworth, 1828 
Argyresthia juniperivorella – Kuznetsov, 1958 
Argyresthia kasyi – Friese, 1963 
Argyresthia kuwayamella – Matsumura, 1931 
Argyresthia laevigatella – Herrich-Schäffer, 1855 
Argyresthia lamiella – Bradley, 1965 
Argyresthia laricella – Kearfott, 1908 
Argyresthia leuconota – Turner, 1913 
Argyresthia leuculias – Meyrick, 
Argyresthia libocedrella – Busck, 1917 
Argyresthia liparodes – Meyrick, 1914 
Argyresthia literella – Haworth, 1828 
Argyresthia lustralis – Meyrick, 1911 
Argyresthia luteella – (Chambers, 1875)
Argyresthia maculosa – Tengström, 1874 
Argyresthia magna – Moriuti, 1969 
Argyresthia majorella – Müller-Rutz, 1934 
Argyresthia mariana – Freeman, 1972 
Argyresthia marmorata – Frey, 1880 
Argyresthia media – Braun, 1914 
Argyresthia melitaula – Meyrick, 1918 
Argyresthia mendica – Haworth, 1828 
Argyresthia mesocausta – Meyrick, 1913 
Argyresthia metallicolor – Moriuti, 1969 
Argyresthia minusculella – Rebel, 1940 
Argyresthia mirabiella – Toll, 1948 
Argyresthia monochromella – Busck, 1922 
Argyresthia montana – Fissetchko, 1970 
Argyresthia montella – Chambers, 1877 
Argyresthia mutuurai – Moriuti, 1964 
Argyresthia nemorivaga – Moriuti, 1969 
Argyresthia niphospora – Meyrick, 1938 
Argyresthia nitidella – Fabricius, 1787 
Argyresthia nivifraga – Diakonoff, 1955 
Argyresthia notoleuca – (Turner, 1913)
Argyresthia nymphocoma – Meyrick, 1919 
Argyresthia ochridorsis – Zeller, 1877 
Argyresthia oleaginella – Standfuss, 1851 
Argyresthia oreadella – Clemens, 1860 
Argyresthia oreasella – Chambers, 1877 
Argyresthia ornatipennella – Moriuti, 1974 
Argyresthia ossea – Haworth, 1828 
Argyresthia pallidella – Braun, 1918 
Argyresthia pedmontella – Chambers, 1877 
Argyresthia pentanoma – Meyrick, 1913 
Argyresthia perbella – Moriuti, 1969 
Argyresthia percussella – Zeller, 1877 
Argyresthia perezi – Vives, 2001 
Argyresthia picea – Freeman, 1972 
Argyresthia pilatella – Braun, 1910 
Argyresthia plectrodes – Meyrick, 1913 
Argyresthia plicipunctella – Walsingham, 1890 
Argyresthia praecocella – Zeller, 1839 
Argyresthia prenjella – Rebel, 1901 
Argyresthia pretiosa – Staudinger, 1880 
Argyresthia pruniella – cherry blossom tineid – Clerck, 1759 
Argyresthia psamminopa – Meyrick, 1932 
Argyresthia pseudotsuga – Freeman, 1972 
Argyresthia pulchella – Zeller, 1846 
Argyresthia pumilella 	Gibeaux, 1983
Argyresthia purella – Chrétien, 1908 
Argyresthia purpurascentella – Stainton, 1849 
Argyresthia pusiella 	Gibeaux, 1983
Argyresthia pygmaeella – Hübner, 1816 
Argyresthia quadristrigella – Zeller, 1873 
Argyresthia quercicolella – Chambers, 1877 
Argyresthia rara – Moriuti, 1969 
Argyresthia resplenderella Gibeaux, 1983
Argyresthia reticulata – Staudinger, 1877 
Argyresthia retinella – Zeller, 1839 
Argyresthia rileiella – Busck, 1907 
Argyresthia ruidosa – Braun, 1940 
Argyresthia sabinae – Moriuti, 1965 
Argyresthia saporella – Matsumura, 1931 
Argyresthia semifasciella – Stephens, 1835 
Argyresthia semiflavella – Christoph, 1882 
Argyresthia semifusca – Haworth, 1828 
Argyresthia semitestacella – Curtis, 1833 
Argyresthia semitrunca – Meyrick, 1907 
Argyresthia sorbiella – Treitschke, 1835 
Argyresthia spinosella (synonym: Argyresthia mendica)
Argyresthia stilpnota – Meyrick, 1913 
Argyresthia submontana – Frey, 1870 
Argyresthia subreticulata – Walsingham, 1882 
Argyresthia subrimosa – Meyrick, 1932 
Argyresthia taiwanensis – Friese & Moriuti, 1968 
Argyresthia tallasica – Fissetchko, 1970 
Argyresthia tarmanni – Gibeaux, 1993 
Argyresthia tetrapodella – Stephens, 1835 
Argyresthia thoracella – Busck, 1907 
Argyresthia thuiella – arborvitae leafminer – Packard, 1871 
Argyresthia thuriferana – Gibeaux, 1992 
Argyresthia trifasciae – Braun, 1910 
Argyresthia trifasciata – juniper ermine moth – Staudinger, 1871 
Argyresthia triplicata – Meyrick, 1914 
Argyresthia tristella 	Gibeaux, 1983
Argyresthia trochaula – Meyrick, 1938 
Argyresthia tsuga – Freeman, 1972 
Argyresthia tutuzicolella – Moriuti, 1969 
Argyresthia undulatella – Chambers, 1874 
Argyresthia uniformella – Dufrane, 1960 
Argyresthia visaliella – Chambers, 1875 
Argyresthia walsinghamella – Milliére, 1880 

The fungus moth Erechthias zebrina was initially assigned to Argyresthia in error.

References

External links

 afromoths for African species

 
Taxonomy articles created by Polbot
Taxa named by Jacob Hübner